Sparrow is a 1993 Italian drama film directed by Franco Zeffirelli. It is an adaptation of Giovanni Verga's novel, Storia di una capinera and was filmed in Sicily in 1993. It stars Angela Bettis, and premiered at the Tokyo International Film Festival in October 1993. It was the final film performance of Valentina Cortese.

Plot
In the Two Sicilies, in cholera-ridden Sicily of 1854, Maria, a future nun, is evacuated from her convent home in Catania to her father's Mount Etna-shadowed villa. During her stay she falls in love with Nino, a family friend. But things fall apart when Catania is declared safe for her to return to Sicily, meaning she must renounce her love and concentrate on serving God.

Cast
 Angela Bettis as Maria
 Johnathon Schaech as Nino
 Vanessa Redgrave as Sister Agata
 Valentina Cortese as Mother Superior
 Frank Finlay as Father Nunzio
 Sinéad Cusack as Matilde
 Denis Quilley as Baron Cesaro
 Pat Heywood as Sister Teresa
 Eva Alexander as Annetta
 John Castle as Giuseppe
 Gareth Thomas as Corrado
 Andrea Cassar as Gigi

Awards and nominations
The film was awarded and nominated for awards in Italy and Portugal.

David di Donatello Awards
 David Award for Best Costume Design (Migliore Costumista) - Piero Tosi (won)

Italian National Syndicate of Film Journalists (Nastro d'Argento)
 Silver Ribbon for Best Costume Design - Piero Tosi (won)

Gramado Film Festival
 Golden Kikito Award for Best Latin Film (Melhor Filme) - Franco Zeffirelli (nomination)

References

External links
 
 

1993 films
Italian drama films
1993 drama films
1990s English-language films
English-language Italian films
1990s Italian-language films
Films based on Italian novels
Films shot in Italy
Films based on works by Giovanni Verga
Films directed by Franco Zeffirelli
Films set in Sicily
1993 multilingual films
Italian multilingual films
1990s Italian films